Han Seung-gyu (born 28 September 1996) is a South Korean football midfielder who plays for Suwon FC.

Club career 
Han played college football for Yonsei University.

International career

Career statistics

Club

Honours

Club 
Ulsan Hyundai:
 Korean FA Cup : 2017

Jeonbuk Hyundai Motors:
 K League 1 : 2019

References

External links 
 

1996 births
Living people
People from Suwon
Association football defenders
South Korean footballers
Ulsan Hyundai FC players
K League 1 players